Shivani Surve is an Indian television actress. She made her acting debut with Navya..Naye Dhadkan Naye Sawaal playing Nimisha and is best known for her role of Vividha in Star Plus's show Jaana Na Dil Se Door. She made her film debut with the Marathi film Triple Seat in 2019.

Shivani has played Devyani in the Star Pravah serial Devyani,  Shivani Bedi in Ek Deewaana Tha on Sony TV. She was also a contestant in the reality show Bigg Boss Marathi 2 in 2019.

Career
She started her career in 2011 with the TV serial Navya. Next, she played the role of Champa in Phulwa. In 2012, she made her lead debut in the Marathi television series Devyani. Subsequently, she featured in the TV series Anamika, Sundar Maza Ghar, Tu Jivala Guntvave. In 2016, she made her comeback in Hindi television by playing the role of Vividha in Jaana Na Dil Se Door. She also appeared in Ek Deewana Tha, Laal Ishq. In 2019, she participated in Bigg Boss Marathi 2.

Personal life
Since 2015, Shivani is dating her Tu Jivala Guntvave co-actor Ajinkya Nanaware.

Filmography

Films

Television

Awards and nominations

References

External links
 

Living people
Actresses from Mumbai
Actresses in Hindi television
Actresses in Marathi cinema
21st-century Indian actresses
Indian television actresses
Actresses in Marathi television
Bigg Boss Marathi contestants
Participants in Indian reality television series
Year of birth missing (living people)